is a Japanese anime director and animator. A member of Sunrise, he is noted for contributing the character designs and key animation to New Mobile Report Gundam Wing and Argento Soma. In 2000, he contributed the main character designs to Final Fantasy IX. He made his directorial debut in 2002 with Witch Hunter Robin.

Works

Anime television series
Yoroiden Samurai Troopers (1988) (animation director)
Mashin Eiyūden Wataru 2 (1990) (animation director)
Mobile Suit Gundam F91 (1991) (animation director)
Mobile Suit Victory Gundam (1993) (animation director)
New Mobile Report Gundam Wing (1995) (character designs)
Gasaraki (1998) (character designs)
Argento Soma (2000) (character designs)
Witch Hunter Robin (2002) (director)
Samurai Champloo (2004) (key animation, storyboards, episode direction, ED animation)
Ergo Proxy (2006) (director, storyboards, animation director)
The Tower of Druaga: the Aegis of Uruk (2008) (storyboards)
Gangsta (2015) (director)

OVA
The Heroic Legend of Arslan (key animation)
Mobile Suit SD Gundam Matsuri SD Sengoku den Tenka Taihei hen (character design, animation director)
Mobile Suit Gundam 0083: Stardust Memory (key animation)
Gundam Wing: Endless Waltz (character Design)
Gundam Evolve 7 (director, storyboards, episode direction and management)
Night Warriors: Darkstalkers' Revenge (character designs)
Blade Runner: Black Out 2022 (character design, animation director)

Movie works
Gundam Wing: Endless Waltz -special edition- (character design)
Mobile Suit Zeta Gundam A New Translation: Heirs to the Stars (animation director, key animation)
Mobile Suit Zeta Gundam III A New Translation: Love is the Pulse of the Stars (key animation)
Street Fighter II: The Animated Movie (character designs)
Dante's Inferno Animated Epic Movie (one of the directors)
Final Fantasy: The Spirits Within (original character designs)
Genocidal Organ (director, screenplay, character design, storyboard, key animation)
Mobile Suit Gundam: Hathaway's Flash (director, storyboard, key animation)

Video games
Final Fantasy IX (2000) (main character designs)

Bibliography
 The Complete Works of Street Fighter II Movie (ストリートファイター2・映画資料全集). Shogakukan, 1994. 
 Top Creators Teach How to Characters (トップクリエイターが教えるキャラクターの創り方『サムライチャンプルー』『エルゴプラクシー』にみるアニメーション制作現場). MC Press, 2007. 
 Genocidal Organ Artworks (虐殺器官 アートワークス). Ichijinsha, 2017.

References

External links

 Shuko Murase anime at Media Arts Database 

1964 births
Anime directors
Japanese animators
Japanese animated film directors
Living people
Sunrise (company) people